Fergus Blackie was a former justice of the High Court of Zimbabwe. A former attorney (1963), advocate (1966) and senior counsel (1980).

Background
He began his judicial career in 1978 when he was appointed a Senior Judge of Water and Administrative Courts, culminating in an appointment to the bench of the High Court in 1986. He fell from power in 2002 after he successfully brought charges against then Justice Minister Patrick Chinamasa for "scandalizing the court"; after the trial, Chinamasa had Blackie arrested and charged with two counts of corruption.

Blackie died in South Africa on April 24, 2021.

References

Year of birth missing (living people)
Living people
20th-century Zimbabwean judges
Rhodesian Front politicians
Rhodesian judges
White Zimbabwean people
White Rhodesian people
Rhodesian lawyers
21st-century Zimbabwean judges